Sir Hugh Hamersley (6 July 1565 – 19 October 1636) was a 17th-century merchant who was Lord Mayor of London in 1627.

Business interests
Hamersley's family estate was at Pyrton Manor near Watlington, Oxfordshire, but he rose to prominence in London as a merchant. From 1601 he was a member of the Haberdasher's Company. He was a member of the committee of the East India Company from 1606 to 1611 and again from 1614 to 1620. He was a member of the Court of Assistants from 1614 to 1618 and  Treasurer from 1618 to 1620.

Later career

Hamersley  was Sheriff of London for the year 1618 to 1619 and was elected an alderman of the City of London for Bishopsgate ward on 16 July 1619. He was Master of the Haberdashers Company from 1619 to 1620 and became president of the Honourable Artillery Company in 1619, retaining the position until 1633. In 1622 he became alderman for Aldgate ward until his death. He became Governor of the Russia Company and Governor of the Levant Company in 1623. In 1627 he became Lord Mayor of London and served another term as Master of the Haberdashers Company. After his term as Mayor he was knighted by King Charles I on 8 June 1628. He was a member of the committee of the East India Company from 1630 to 1636. He became Colonel Trained Bands of the City in 1631. In 1634 he became president of Christ's Hospital charitable school.

After Hamersley's death a memorial was erected by his widow in the church of St Andrew Undershaft, London. He had married in 1597, fathering fifteen children. A portrait of him in mayoral robes was donated to Haberdasher's Hall, London by his great-grandson in 1716. The Ashbourne portrait is also believed to represent Hamersley, and not, as long thought, William Shakespeare.

References

1565 births
1636 deaths
People from Watlington, Oxfordshire
Sheriffs of the City of London
17th-century lord mayors of London
16th-century English businesspeople
17th-century English businesspeople
Knights Bachelor